Alexander Graham can refer to:

 Alexander Graham (politician) (1816-1895), American politician
 Alexander Graham (Lord Mayor) (born 1938), a former Lord Mayor of London
 Alexander Graham (swimmer) (born 1995), Australian swimmer
 Alexander H. Graham (1890-1977), American attorney and politician
 Alex Graham (footballer) (1889-1972), Scottish footballer, played for Hurlford, Hamilton Academical, Larkhall Utd, Woolwich Arsenal, Vale of Leven, Brentford, Folkestone
 Alex Graham (footballer, born 1912), Scottish footballer, played for 	Burnbank Amateurs, Vale of Clyde, West Ham Utd, Albion Rovers, Cowdenbeath, Stenhousemuir, Morton, Rochdale, Bradford Park Avenue, Halifax Town